This is a list of shopping malls on the island of Cyprus (listed in order of total floor area).

References 

Larnaca
Cyprus
Shopping malls